Ray Turnbull may refer to:

 Ray Turnbull (American football) (1880–1939), American football player and coach, physician
 Ray Turnbull (curler) (1939–2017), Canadian curler